David Alfredo Andrade Gómez (born 9 July 1993) is a Mexican professional footballer who plays as a left-back for Liga MX club Atlético San Luis.

Honours
Santos Laguna
Liga MX: Clausura 2018

References

External links

David Andrade at Chiapas Career 
David Andrade at Arriving to Santos Laguna 

1993 births
Living people
Sportspeople from Manzanillo, Colima
Footballers from Colima
Association football midfielders
Chiapas F.C. footballers
Santos Laguna footballers
Liga MX players
Ascenso MX players
Mexican footballers